Frank Davis (29 May 1904 – 12 September 1973) was an Australian cricketer. He played two first-class matches for Tasmania between 1933 and 1934.

See also
 List of Tasmanian representative cricketers

References

External links
 

1904 births
1973 deaths
Australian cricketers
Tasmania cricketers
Cricketers from Launceston, Tasmania